Max Purcell was the defending champion but chose not to defend his title.

Andrey Kuznetsov won the title after Jason Kubler retired trailing 3–6, 1–2 in the final.

Seeds

Draw

Finals

Top half

Bottom half

References

External links
Main draw
Qualifying draw

President's Cup II - 1